Kavan John Cotter (born 3 May 1999) is an English semi-professional footballer who plays as a midfielder for  club Wealdstone.

Career

Luton Town and loan spells
Born in Brent, Greater London, Cotter started his career with Arsenal's youth academy, before moving to Queens Park Rangers. He then joined Luton Town at under-13 level, with whom he started his scholarship. Cotter was a member of the under-18 team that won the Youth Alliance South East title and the Youth Alliance Cup in 2015–16, and also reached the quarter-finals of the FA Youth Cup, in which they lost 1–0 to Blackburn Rovers. He captained the under-18 team the following season and made his first-team debut in a 2–1 victory away to Gillingham in an EFL Trophy group stage match on 30 August 2016. Cotter signed a professional contract with Luton on 23 May 2017. After signing, manager Nathan Jones said "It will be a big year for him as it's going to be a year when he can see if he can bridge that gap and we'll give him every opportunity to do that".

On 11 August 2017, Cotter signed for Southern League Premier Division club Hitchin Town on a one-month youth loan. He made six league appearances before returning to Luton. Cotter rejoined Hitchin on a one-month youth loan on 22 September. The loan was extended for another month on 23 October, before later being extended for a third month on 21 November, having made 22 appearances for Hitchin up to that point in 2017–18. He was recalled by Luton on 5 December, and started in a 4–0 home win over West Ham United U21 in the EFL Trophy second round, in which he scored Luton's third goal. Cotter returned to Hitchin on a one-month youth loan three days later. Having made a further six appearances for Hitchin, Cotter returned to Luton after the loan expired. On 12 February 2018, he rejoined Hitchin on a one-month youth loan and made five further appearances. Cotter was loaned out again on 16 March, joining National League South club Oxford City for the rest of the season. He finished the loan with one goal from nine appearances, as Oxford finished the season 16th in the table. He was released by Luton at the end of the season.

Hemel Hempstead Town
Following his release by Luton, Cotter signed for National League South club Hemel Hempstead Town, who loaned him out to Kings Langley of the Southern League Premier Division South on 13 August 2018. His debut came the following day in a 4–2 home defeat to Harrow Borough and he completed the loan spell with five appearances. After returning to Hemel Hempstead, he made his debut for the club on 22 September in a 6–1 away win over Bowers & Pitsea in the FA Cup second qualifying round.

Wealdstone
Cotter signed for fellow National League South club Wealdstone on 28 May 2019.

Career statistics

References

1999 births
Living people
Footballers from the London Borough of Brent
English footballers
Association football midfielders
Luton Town F.C. players
Hitchin Town F.C. players
Oxford City F.C. players
Hemel Hempstead Town F.C. players
Kings Langley F.C. players
Wealdstone F.C. players
Southern Football League players
National League (English football) players